Dimitrios Arvanitis  (born 9 August 1980) is a Greek footballer who currently plays for Gamma Ethniki club Paniliakos, as a centre back.

Club career 
Arvanitis previously played in the Greek Super League with Paniliakos, OFI Crete and Olympiakos Volou. He also played for Ionikos, Kallithea, Panelefsiniakos, Asteras Amaliada, Paniliakos and Aias Gastounis.

References

External links
 
Myplayer profile

1980 births
Living people
Greek footballers
Paniliakos F.C. players
OFI Crete F.C. players
Olympiacos Volos F.C. players
Ionikos F.C. players
Kallithea F.C. players
Association football defenders
Panelefsiniakos F.C. players
People from Amaliada
Footballers from Western Greece